Carmen, officially the Municipality of Carmen, is a 4th class municipality in the province of Agusan del Norte, Philippines. According to the 2020 census, it has a population of 23,172 people.

History
The first Christian settlers of Kabayawa village (now Carmen) was the family of Fulgencio Loque and Demetria Mamba from Jagna, Bohol... in the early 1900s. The family encounters of the natives... Manobo/Higaonon tribes of Mankalasi clan was not that difficult as the natives were friendly. Day to day's trade was done through a Barter System... wherein goods and services were directly exchanged for other goods and services without using any money... and through this “system”, parcels of lands were also being acquired.

In early days, parcel of land corners were planted with a Moringa tree to mark and determines its boundaries... which was later replaced with concrete pin or “mojon” when the Spanish authorities assume control of the village.

The news of abundance then spread among the siblings and extended families of the new settlers, resulting in an influx of newcomers. The Loque's and Mamba's settled in the now poblacion... while the extended families in the adjoining areas to the east, west and south of poblacion like; the Pacon, the Quesaba, the Honcolada, the Malimit, and others. Farther west the Rojales and the Jamito. While the Ebarle, the Jamero, the Sajor and the Salas in Tagcatong, and the Balmoceda in Goso-on.

Carmen got its present name from the miraculous image of the Virgin of Mount Carmen, believed to have been instrumental in killing the leader of the bandits who used to inhabit the place.

A Spanish Soldier named Juan Cardoniga was supposed to have fired his rifle at the leader of the outlaws who possessed an amulet of some source. Since his rifle did not work, Cardoniga got the image of the virgin from his necklace and place it inside the hole of the barrel after which he succeeded in firing the rifle and in killing the outlaw chief.

It was Rev. Saturnino Urios, the famous Jesuit priest of Agusan, who suggested that the name Kabayawa be changed to Carmen in honor of the secret image.

Carmen was created into a municipality in 1949, when the barrios of Carmen, Tagcatong, Cahayagan and San Agustin were separated from the municipality of Nasipit and constituted into the newly created town, by virtue of Republic Act No. 380 which was approved on June 15, 1949. This law was sponsored by Congressman Marcos M. Calo. The town came into being on July 1, 1949.

Geography
According to the Philippine Statistics Authority, the municipality has a land area of  constituting  of the  total area of Agusan del Norte.

Carmen is strategically located in the Western Agusan Corridor. It is bounded on the north by the Butuan Bay, south by Buenavista, east by Nasipit and west by Misamis Oriental. About half of these are fully developed and are already producing sweet mango fruits which are being sold in volume in Cebu and Manila and to neighboring municipalities and Butuan City.

Climate

Barangays
Carmen is politically subdivided into 8 barangays.

Demographics

In the 2020 census, Carmen had a population of 23,172.

Economy

Government

Elected government officials of Carmen for the term of 2016-2019:
 Mayor: Ramon "Monching RMC" M. Calo
 Vice Mayor: Wilfredo T. Taglucop
 Sangguniang Bayan:
 Eva D. Palarca 
 Maria Riza P. Ledesma
 Diosdado R. Palang-at
 Gilda A. Samaco
 Abraham Dela Cruz Jr.
 Julius Tamayo
 Corazon Alpuerto
 Jan Ledesma
 SB Secretary:
 Felomino Palisan Jr.

List of former mayors
 Honculada, Nicanor O. - 1949–1951
 De Guzman, Arturo - 1952–1955
 Malimit, Jose - 1956–1960, 1964-1967
 Degamo, Esteban - 1960–1963
 Calo, Tranquilino Jr. - 1968–1969, 1972–1985, 1988-1993
 Campos, Ernesto - 1969–1971
 Pacon, Dionesio - 1986–1987
 Aparecio, Joaquin - 1987
 Battad, Arnulfo - 1987 - 1988 (until January only)
 Luneta, Eliseo - 1993–1995
 Calo, Ramon - 1996–2004, 2007–present
 Calo, Jovitte - 2004–2007

Tourism

 Carmen Municipal Hall: new municipal hall officially opened on July 1, 2011.
 Plaza Beach Resort: beach covered with white sands in its coast located at Sitio Bulihon, Barangay Tagcatong.
 Mount Carmel View Park: park commonly called by Carmenanons as "Marcos Park", located at San Isidro, Barangay Tagcatong. From here, one can view the entire Carmen and nearby municipalities, and the island province of Camiguin.
 Punta Diwata Cave: one of the popular destinations in Carmen consisting of 43 caves, located in Barangay Vinapor.
 Balite Beach Resort: located in Barangay Vinapor.
 Vinapor Blue Waters: located near the Cliffs of Barangay Vinapor, this resort features carved stones formed into a dinosaurs, a reason for it to be commonly called "Jurassic Park".
 Veranda I and II Resorts: a beach resort, hotel and convention venue located at Barangays Tagcatong and Rojales. It has air-conditioned rooms and suites, air conditioned cabañas and other facilities like cottages fronting beachfront, seafood and Chinese restaurants, mini-bar, convention hall and swimming pool.
 Scuba diving sites: Carmen is known for its adventurous dive sites along the Punta Diwata Reefs and Balete Wall. It has six dive sites. Reef life includes soft and hard corals plus abundant reef and pelagic fishes. Profile ranges from sloping wall to cliffs with depths from 40 ft. to over a hundred, with generally sandy floors. Prime sites are located in barangays Vinapor, Tagcatong & Poblacion.
 Cabatuan Beach
 Kibanlag Falls

Transportation
In February 2017, the new integrated bus terminal was opened with buses for travel to and from Butuan and Cagayan de Oro.

Trisikad is also an option when traveling within the area of Carmen and also from the town proper to Nasipit.

Education

Elementary

 Antonio Quiamjot Elementary School
 Cahayagan Elementary School
 Carmen Central Elementary School
 Cervantina Elementary School
 Doña Josefa Elementary School
 Elpidio Salas Elementary School
 Gosoon Elementary School
 Manoligao Elementary School
 Rojales Elementary School
 San Agustin Elementary School
 San Isidro Elementary School
 Tagcatong Central Elementary School

Secondary
 Carmen National High School
 Cahayagan National High School
 Manoligao National High School
 Our Lady of Carmen Academy of Caraga, Incorporated
 Vinapor National High School

References

External links

 [ Philippine Standard Geographic Code]

Municipalities of Agusan del Norte